Guido Brunner (27 May 1930 – 2 December 1997) was a Spanish-born German diplomat and politician of the liberal Free Democratic Party. He served as European Commissioner for Energy, Research and Science in the Jenkins Commission from 1977 to 1981. He was a Member of the Bundestag from 1980 to 1981, Senator for the Economy in the government of West Berlin in 1981 and Ambassador to Spain from 1981 to 1992. Tam Dalyell described him as "one of the unsung architects of the Europe we have today."

Career

Brunner was born and grew up in Madrid, where his father was a businessman. He moved to West Germany after the Second World War, where he studied law. He subsequently earned a PhD in law in Germany and a licentiate's degree in law in Spain.

Early diplomatic career
In 1955 he joined the West German diplomatic service and was posted to New York City as a member of the German delegation to the United Nations from 1960 to 1968. He was director of the press office of the Foreign Office from 1970 to 1972 and director of planning from 1972 to 1974. He headed the West German delegation to the 1973 Conference on Security and Co-operation in Europe.

European Commissioner
He served as European Commissioner for Energy, Research and Science in the Jenkins Commission from 1977 to 1981. Tam Dalyell described him as "one of the unsung architects of the Europe we have today," and in particular noted his goodwill towards the United Kingdom.

Career in German politics
Brunner was a member of the Bundestag from 1980 to 1981. In 1981 he served as Senator for the Economy and Deputy Mayor in the government of West Berlin.

Ambassador to Spain
Brunner left German politics to become Ambassador to his country of birth, Spain, in 1981, and served until his retirement in 1992.

Family
Brunner was married to Christa née Speidel, the daughter of General Hans Speidel, the Supreme Commander of the NATO ground forces in Central Europe from 1957 to 1963.

References 

German European Commissioners
1930 births
1997 deaths
German diplomats
Senators of Berlin
European Commissioners 1977–1981